Green Pinckney Russell (1861/1863–1939), was an American teacher, principal, school district supervisor, and college president. He was the first licensed African American teacher in Lexington, Kentucky. Russell was the first "Supervisor of Negro Schools" in Lexington, and he served two-terms as president of Kentucky State Industrial College for Colored Persons (now Kentucky State University).

Biography 

Green Pinckney Russell was born on December 25 on either 1861 or 1863 in Logan County, Kentucky. He attended public schools in Russellville, Kentucky. 

Russell graduated from Berea College (1885), and Wilberforce University (1913).

He was the principal of "Colored School No. 1." (later known as Russell School) in Lexington, Kentucky. In 1895, Colored School No. 1, was renamed the Russell School by the mayor H. C. Duncan of the Lexington.

Russell was the first "Supervisor of Negro Schools" in Lexington from 1896 to 1912. He was twice president of Kentucky State Industrial College for Colored Persons (now Kentucky State University) from 1912 to 1923, and from 1924 to 1929. 

Russell lived in Frankfort for many years. He died on October 18, 1936 in Waukegan, Illinois, and is buried at Cove Haven Cemetery (formerly Greenwood Cemetery) in Lexington.

References

External links 
 

1861 births
1936 deaths
People from Logan County, Kentucky
People from Frankfort, Kentucky
Berea College alumni
Wilberforce University alumni
Kentucky State University faculty
20th-century African-American educators
19th-century African-American educators